San Diego Surf Soccer Club, commonly known as San Diego Surf or just Surf, is an American youth soccer club based in San Diego County, California. It is a member of the Elite Clubs National League.

History 
San Diego Surf Soccer Club was founded in 1977. According to itself, it is the oldest competitive youth soccer club in San Diego. As of November 2022, Surf has won 12 national championships, 29 regional championships, and over 74 state championships. 

On November 15, 2022, it was announced that Surf would join the Women's Premier Soccer League in the 2023 season.

Notable people

Coaches 

  Carlos Alvarez
  Billy Garton
  Ryan Guy
  Scott Morrison
  Nelson Pizarro

Players 

 Corey Baird
 Miguel Berry
 Catarina Macario
 Simon Mršić
 Sebastian Soto
 Luca de la Torre
 Gabriel Oksanen
 Duran Ferree

References

External links
Official website

Soccer clubs in San Diego
1977 establishments in California
Youth soccer in the United States
Association football clubs established in 1977